The 1987 All-Ireland Senior Football Championship Final was the 100th All-Ireland Final and the deciding match of the 1987 All-Ireland Senior Football Championship, an inter-county Gaelic football tournament for the top teams in Ireland.

Meath won with a goal by Colm O'Rourke. The win was also helped by poor shooting from Larry Tompkins, as he missed 6 of 8 frees in the second half.

References

All-Ireland Senior Football Championship Final
All-Ireland Senior Football Championship Final, 1987
All-Ireland Senior Football Championship Finals
All-Ireland Senior Football Championship Finals
Cork county football team matches
Meath county football team matches